The Cranberry Wilderness is a  U.S. wilderness area in the Monongahela National Forest of southeast West Virginia, United States. Its name derives from the nearby Cranberry Glades as well as from the Cranberry River and Cranberry Mountain. In addition to being wilderness, it is a designated black bear sanctuary.

Geography
The Cranberry Wilderness is located mostly in Pocahontas County, with a small portion  in Webster County. The wilderness is drained by the Williams River and the Cranberry River, both of which are tributaries of the Gauley River, which in turn unites with the New River to form the Kanawha, a tributary of the Ohio. The area just to the east of the Cranberry Wilderness is drained by tributaries of the Greenbrier River which flows into the New.

The wilderness is located in the Yew Mountains, which are part of the Allegheny Mountains. The lowest elevation in the wilderness is at  along the Williams River at Three Forks of Williams River, where it exits the wilderness.

History

Wilderness designation

Counterculture events
The national Rainbow Gathering has been held twice at the Cranberry Wilderness — in 1980 and in 2005.

2009 addition
The Omnibus Public Land Management Act of 2009 added  of adjacent land to the Cranberry Wilderness.    This area, which was previously known as the Cranberry Backcountry, is located between the Williams River and the Cranberry River. It protects several tributaries of both the Williams and Cranberry Rivers which are popular trout streams. The area already has an excellent trail system connected to the original wilderness.

Hiking trails

 Big Beechy Trail – 6.5 miles (10.5 kilometers)
 Birch Log Trail – 3.0 miles (4.8 kilometers)
 Black Mountain Trail – 2.0 miles  (3.2 kilometers)
 County Line Trail – 9.5 miles (15.3 kilometers)
 District Line Trail –  3.0 miles (4.8 kilometers)
 Forks of the Cranberry Trail – 6.0 miles (9.7 kilometers)
 North South Trail – 14.0 miles (22.5 kilometers)
 Forks By-Pass Trail – 2.0 miles  (3.2 kilometers)
 Middle Fork Trail – 9.0 miles (14.5 kilometers)
 North Fork Trail – 7.5 miles (12.1 kilometers)
 Laurelly Branch Trail – 3.5 miles (5.6 kilometers)
 Tumbling Rock Trail – 2.5 miles (4.0 kilometers)
 Little Fork Trail – 3.5 miles (5.6 kilometers)
 Lick Branch Trail – 2.1 miles (3.4 kilometers)
 Rough Run Trail – 3.0 miles (4.8 kilometers)

See also
List of U.S. Wilderness Areas
Wilderness Act

References

External links 
 Cranberry Wilderness map
 Wilderness.net
 Cranberry Wilderness, West Virginia – GORP
 TopoQuest topographic map
West Virginia Wilderness Coalition

IUCN Category Ib
Monongahela National Forest
Protected areas of Pocahontas County, West Virginia
Protected areas of Webster County, West Virginia
Wilderness areas of West Virginia
Protected areas established in 1983
1983 establishments in West Virginia